Sam Cross (born 26 August 1992) is a Welsh rugby union player who plays for Wales and club rugby for the Ospreys as a flanker. Cross is an experienced rugby sevens player and has turned out for the Wales Sevens team in over a hundred matches, as well as captaining the side at 24 years old. Cross was a part of Team GB at the 2016 Summer Olympics in Rio winning a silver medal.
Cross was selected for the Wales national team in 2017 with a substitution debut against Australia. He was later selected for his first international start a few months later against Georgia.

Personal history
Cross was born in Abergavenny in Wales in 1992. He grew up in Brynmawr and after leaving secondary school he attended Cardiff Metropolitan University where he took up a Sport & Exercise Science scholarship.

Rugby career
Cross first played rugby as a child for the Youth section of Brynmawr RFC. He then joined Ebbw Vale before switching to the Cardiff Met team. An all-round sportsman, Cross also played football at county level for Gwent and was capped for Wales in rugby league at the under-18 level.

Cross was selected for both the Welsh Students team and the GB Students, the latter at under 15 and under 18, and was part of the team that won the World Students Championships in Brive. He also played in the 2013 Students Olympics. Despite growing up playing the 15-a-side variant of rugby union, it was in rugby sevens that he made his mark. He has made over a hundred appearances as part of the Wales Sevens mainly in the World Rugby Sevens Series.

In 2016 Cross was selected to represent Great Britain at the Summer Olympics in Rio as part of the nation's rugby sevens team.

References

External links
 
 
 

Welsh rugby union players
Newport RFC players
Living people
Rugby union flankers
Male rugby sevens players
1992 births
Rugby sevens players at the 2016 Summer Olympics
Olympic rugby sevens players of Great Britain
Great Britain national rugby sevens team players
Olympic silver medallists for Great Britain
Olympic medalists in rugby sevens
Medalists at the 2016 Summer Olympics
Rugby union players from Abergavenny
Welsh rugby sevens players
Cardiff Metropolitan University RFC players
Wales international rugby union players
Ospreys (rugby union) players